Trichostenidea rufopunctata is a species of beetle in the family Cerambycidae, and the only species in the genus Trichostenidea. It was described by Breuning in 1948.

References

Desmiphorini
Beetles described in 1948